Uechi (written: 上地) is a Japanese surname. Notable people with the surname include:

, Founder of Uechi-Ryū.
, Son of Uechi Kanbun, forefront of standardizing Uechi-Ryū in the 1950s and 60's.
, Eldest son of Uechi Kanei, took over responsibility of the Futenma Dojo and its association after Uechi Kanei retired.

References

Japanese-language surnames